Southern Air Command may refer to:

Southern Air Command (India)
Southern Air Command SAAF, South Africa
United States Air Forces Southern Command